Kim Johannesen (born 22 August 1985 in Bærum, Norway) is a Norwegian Jazz musician (guitar) and improviser living in Oslo.

Career 
Johannesen has studied jazz performance at the Norwegian Academy of Music in Oslo where he is currently (2013) studying for a Master's degree in improvisation. He has been performing on venues in Oslo with various groups regularly since 2005, and has toured clubs and festivals in Europe with Petter Wettre Quartet, Revolver!, Speakeasy, Wettre/Vinaccia/Johannesen and Golden Dawn. In addition he has collaborated with the likes of John Butcher, Axel Dörner, Raymond Strid, Ingebrigt Håker Flaten, Chris Corsano, Roger Turner, Pat Thomas, Joe Williamson, Frode Gjerstad, Per Zanussi, Klaus Holm, Tatsuya Nakatani and Joel Grip.

Johannesen collaborates closely with Svein Magnus Furu and also composes music on the albums The Eco Logic (2009), Speakeasy including with Tore Sandbakken in the album Kayak (2009), Barrage, Golden Dawn, Revolver! and Jeremy Rose Chiba with the album Blue Then White (2009). He also performs regularly in ensembles led by Petter Wettre.

Discography 

Within Speakeasy including Tore Sandbakken and Svein Magnus Furu
2009: Kayak (AIM Sound City)

With Svein Magnus Furu
2009: The Eco Logic (Creative Sources)

With Jeremy Rose Chiba
2009: Blue Then White, (Earshift Records)

With Kim-Erik Pedersen and Chris Corsano
2011: Door To Door (FMR Records)

Within Akode including Alan Wilkinson, Ola Høyer and Dag Erik Knedal Andersen
2012: Sa(n)dnes(s) (Gaffer Records)

References

External links 

1985 births
Living people
Musicians from Bærum
Norwegian Academy of Music alumni
Avant-garde jazz guitarists
Norwegian jazz guitarists
Norwegian jazz composers
Male jazz composers
21st-century Norwegian guitarists
21st-century Norwegian male musicians
Petter Wettre Quartet members